The Paratour SD is a family of Canadian paramotors that was designed by Eric Dufour and produced by Paratour of Saint-Chrysostome, Quebec for powered paragliding. Now out of production, when it was available the series was supplied complete and ready-to-fly.

"SD" stands for "Safe & Strong Design".

Design and development
The SD series was designed to comply with the US FAR 103 Ultralight Vehicles rules as well as Canadian and European regulations. It features a paraglider-style wing, single-place accommodation and a single engine in pusher configuration with a reduction drive and a  diameter two-bladed composite propeller, depending on the model.

As is the case with all paramotors, take-off and landing is accomplished by foot. Inflight steering is accomplished via handles that actuate the canopy brakes, creating roll and yaw.

Variants
SD 100
Model with a  RDM 100 engine in pusher configuration with a 3.8:1 ratio reduction drive and a  diameter two-bladed composite propeller.
SD 120
Model with a  Radne Raket 120 engine in pusher configuration with a 3.8:1 ratio reduction drive and a  diameter two-bladed composite propeller.
SD 125
Model with a  RDM 100 engine in pusher configuration with a 3.8:1 ratio reduction drive and a  diameter two-bladed composite propeller.

Specifications (SD 120)

References

SD
2000s Canadian ultralight aircraft
Single-engined pusher aircraft
Paramotors